Mattson is a Swedish patronymic surname, meaning "son of Matt (shortened form of Matthew)".  It is rare as a given name.

People
 Brad Mattson, Silicon Valley entrepreneur
 Eli Mattson, pianist, singer, and runner-up on America's Got Talent
 Ellen Mattson, Swedish writer
 Hållbus Totte Mattson, Swedish musician
 Howard W. Mattson (1927–1998), American magazine editor
 Ingrid Mattson (born 1963), Canadian activist and scholar
 Jesper Mattson Cruus af Edeby (1576–1622), Swedish soldier and politician
 John Mattson, American screenwriter
 Mark Mattson, American neuroscientist
 Per Mattson (1895–1973), Swedish, Olympics rower
 Ragnar Mattson (1892–1965), Swedish, Olympics high jumper
 Richard Mattson (born 1935), American computer scientist
 Riley Mattson (born 1937), American football player
 Robert Mattson (businessman), (1851–1935), Finnish shipowner and businessman
 Robert W. Mattson, Sr. (b. ?), American politician
 Robin Mattson, American actress
 Mattson Tomlin (born 1990), Romanian screenwriter and producer

Companies
Mattson Technology, California-based semiconductor company

Fiction
 Mattson, a character in the film Child's Play 2

Places
Mattson, Edmonton, a neighbourhood in Edmonton, Canada

See also
Mattson Lake
Matson (disambiguation)
Mattsson
Matheson (disambiguation)
Mathewson

Swedish-language surnames
Patronymic surnames
Surnames from given names